Safsaf ( Ṣafṣāf, "weeping willow") was a Palestinian village 9 kilometres northwest of Safed, present-day Israel. Its villagers fled to Lebanon after the Safsaf massacre in October 1948,  during the 1948 Arab–Israeli War.

History
The village was called Safsofa in Roman times.

According to Yaqut, it was harried in 950 CE by the Hamdanid ruler of Aleppo, Sayf al-Dawla.

Ottoman era
In the early sixteenth century CE, Safsaf was incorporated into the Ottoman Empire, and by the 1596 tax records, it was a village in the nahiyah ("subdistrict") of Jira, part of Sanjak Safad. It had a population of 25 households, an estimated 138 persons, all Muslim. The villagers paid a fixed tax rate of 25%  on several agricultural items, including wheat, barley, olives and fruits, as well as other types of produce, such as beehives and goats; a total of 3,714 akçe. A quarter of the revenue went to a waqf (religious endowment). 

In 1838 Safsaf was noted as a village in the Safad district, while in 1875 Victor Guérin described it as a village with fifteen Muslim families.

In 1881 the PEF's Survey of Western Palestine described Safsaf as a small village situated on a plain, with a population of about 100. They also noted that "ornamented stones of a preexisting public building" had been built into the doorway of the village mosque. The villagers cultivated olive and fig trees and vineyards.

A population list from about 1887 showed Safsaf to have  about 740 inhabitants, all Muslim.

British Mandate era
Safsaf became a part of the British Mandate in 1922. During this time, the village lay on the eastern side of the Safad-Tarshiha highway and extended in a northeast–southwest direction. All the residents of Safsaf were Muslims. A mosque and several shops were located in the village center, and an elementary school was established during this period. Agriculture was the main economic activity, and it was both irrigated from springs and rainfed. Fruits and olives were cultivated on the land north of the village. 

In the 1922 census of Palestine  Safsaf had a population of 521  Muslims,  increasing in the 1931 census to  662, still all  Muslims,  in  a total of 124 houses.

In the 1945 statistics the population was 910 Muslims, with a total of 7,391 dunams of land, according to an official land and population survey. Of this, a total of 2,586 dunums were allotted to cereals; 769 dunums were irrigated or used for orchards,  while a 72 dunams was built-up (urban) area.

1948, and aftermath

On October 29, 1948, Israeli forces assaulted the village as part of Operation Hiram. After the villagers surrendered, some 50-70 men were massacred while bound and four women reported being raped. The IDF records for this massacre remain classified.

In 1949 Kfar Hoshen was established on village land, followed by Bar Yohai in 1979, also on village land.

In 1992 the village site was described: "The site is overgrown with grass and scattered trees among which can be seen a few terraces and piles of stones from destroyed houses. A few houses are inhabited by Israelis. A fraction of surrounding land is cultivated by the settlements, and the rest is forested."

See also
Killings and massacres during the 1948 Palestine War
Depopulated Palestinian locations in Israel

References

Bibliography

 

 

 (Safsaf, p. 93-96, 107)

External links
 welcome to safsaf - Nidal Hamad
Welcome to Safsaf
 Safsaf,  Zochrot
Survey of Western Palestine, Map 4: IAA, Wikimedia commons 
 Safsaf, from the  Khalil Sakakini Cultural Center
Safsaf photos, Dr. Moslih Kanaaneh
Safsaf,  Dr. Khalil Rizk.

District of Safad
Arab villages depopulated during the 1948 Arab–Israeli War
Ancient Jewish settlements of Galilee